Monaco competed at the 2018 European Athletics Championships in Berlin, Germany, from 6–12 August 2018. A delegation of 1 athlete was sent to represent the country.

The following athlete was selected to compete by the Monegasque Athletics Federation.

Women
 Track and road

References

Nations at the 2018 European Athletics Championships
Monaco at the European Athletics Championships
European Athletics Championships